Rubus oklahomus is a North American species of flowering plants in the rose family. It has been found in Texas, and Oklahoma) in the south-central United States.

The genetics of Rubus is extremely complex, so that it is difficult to decide on which groups should be recognized as species. There are many rare species with limited ranges such as this. Further study is suggested to clarify the taxonomy.

References

oklahomus
Plants described in 1932
Flora of Oklahoma
Flora of Texas
Flora without expected TNC conservation status